is a JR West railway station located in Hagi, Yamaguchi Prefecture, Japan.

History 
The station was built in 1964 as a unstaffed station on the initiative of Takeo Kawamura's father, a prefectural assemblyman from the area. From July 28 to August 8, 2013, due to heavy rain damaging the track, train service was suspended from Masuda Station to Nagatoshi Station, including this station.

Layout 
A side platform serving a single track. A station building is on the platform and serves as a waiting room.

Fun Facts 
 The station is promoted by a local government as "the station with the shortest Latin name", based on the fact that, while there are other stations with two Latin letters (Ao, Oe, and Ei), the width of "Ii" is the narrowest amongst others.
 In 2020, 300 pieces of visit certificates is distributed to people who visited.

Adjacent stations

References

External links 
 II-eki (Japanese), JR West official website

Railway stations in Japan opened in 1964
Railway stations in Yamaguchi Prefecture
Sanin Main Line
Stations of West Japan Railway Company